Rebeka Salsabil Ibrahim (born Rebeka Koha; 19 May 1998) is a Latvian-born Qatari weightlifter, two time Junior World Champion and two time European Champion competing in the 58 kg division until 2018 and 59 kg starting in 2018 after the International Weightlifting Federation reorganized the categories.

She was coached by Eduards Andruškevičs, who has also been coaching Olympic medalist Viktors Ščerbatihs and Artūrs Plēsnieks.

In 2023 Rebeka returned to weightlifting representing Qatar and winning Qatar Cup and West Asian Championships.

Career
She currently has junior world records in the clean & jerk and total in the 59 kg division.

Olympics
In 2016, she competed at the Summer Olympics in the 53 kg division placing fourth overall. She was named Latvian Rising Star of the Year in 2016 after her performance at the 2016 Summer Olympics.

World Championships
In 2017, she competed at the World Weightlifting Championships winning the bronze medal in the snatch and total.

In 2018, the IWF restructured the weight classes, and Koha competed in the newly created 59 kg division. She followed up her bronze medal performance in 2017 with stronger performance at the 2018 World Weightlifting Championships winning another bronze medal in the snatch and total and setting junior world records in the snatch, clean & jerk, and total.

European Championships
In 2016, she competed at the European Weightlifting Championships winning a bronze medal in the total in the 53 kg category. The following year she competed at the 2017 European Weightlifting Championships winning a gold medal in the snatch, and silver medals in the clean & jerk and total in the 58 kg category.

At the 2018 European Weightlifting Championships, Koha swept gold in all lifts (snatch, clean & jerk, and the total) and became European Champion in the 58 kg division.

Other Competitions
She competed at the 2017 Junior World Weightlifting Championships, winning silver medals in the snatch and clean & jerk, but a gold medal in the total, becoming Junior World Champion in the 58 kg division.

In 2018, coming off her Junior World Championships gold medal, she defended her title as the Junior World Champion by winning gold medals in all lifts at the 2018 Junior World Weightlifting Championships.

Major results

Private life 
In spring of 2020 Koha became engaged with the Qatari discus thrower Moaaz Mohamed Ibrahim and on July 26 announced via her Instagram account she had converted to Islam. On August 5 she announced her retirement from sport.

References

External links

1998 births
Living people
Latvian female weightlifters
Qatari weightlifters
Weightlifters at the 2014 Summer Youth Olympics
People from Ventspils
Olympic weightlifters of Latvia
Weightlifters at the 2016 Summer Olympics
World Weightlifting Championships medalists
European Weightlifting Championships medalists
Latvian Muslims
Converts to Islam